The Roman Catholic Diocese of Neuquén covers Neuquén Province, in Argentina.  It is a suffragan see to the Archdiocese of Mendoza.

History
On 10 April 1961, Blessed John XXIII established the Diocese of Neuquén from the Diocese of Viedma.

Bishops

Ordinaries
Jaime Francisco de Nevares (1961–1991) 
Agustín Roberto Radrizzani, S.D.B. (1991–2001), appointed Bishop of Lomas de Zamora
Marcelo Angiolo Melani, S.D.B. (2002–2011)
Virginio Domingo Bressanelli, S.C.I. (2011–2017)
Fernando Croxatto (2017–present)

Coadjutor bishop
Virginio Domingo Bressanelli, S.C.I. (2010–2011)

References

Neuquen
Neuquen
Neuquen
Neuquen
1961 establishments in Argentina